The 1982 Maryland Terrapins football team represented the University of Maryland in the 1982 NCAA Division I-A football season. In their first season under head coach Bobby Ross, the Terrapins compiled an 8–4 record, finished in second place in the Atlantic Coast Conference, and outscored their opponents 373 to 220. Ranked No. 19 at the end of the regular season, Maryland lost to No. 9 Washington in the 1982 Aloha Bowl.  The team's statistical leaders included Boomer Esiason with 2,302 passing yards, Willie Joyner with 1,039 rushing yards, and Russell Davis with 445 receiving yards.

Schedule

Roster

References

Maryland
Maryland Terrapins football seasons
Maryland Terrapins football